The fifth season of StarStruck, aka (StarStruck V) is a Philippine television reality talent competition show, was broadcast on GMA Network. Hosted by Raymond Gutierrez, Carla Abellana and Dennis Trillo. Carla Abellana replaced Jolina Magdangal for this season, while former replaced Dingdong Dantes, as the former replaced Richard Gomez, who will run as representative of the 4th district of the Province of Leyte as host of the game show Family Feud.

Major changes happened on the show. The regular daily show became a daily update show that focused on the lives of the contestants and their activities and tests on the show. It was hosted by the show's the segment hosts are StarStruck graduates with Mark Herras, LJ Reyes, Arci Muñoz and Paulo Avelino. They serve as StarStruck Shoutout, who is tasked to join the hopefuls as they go through every phase of the competition, it premiered on November 15, 2009. The council was composed of Lolit Solis, Floy Quintos and Iza Calzado act as the members of the Sunshine Dizon was first reported to be part of the council in the place of Iza Calzado but had to turn down the offer due to health problems.

The five mentors are from Acting mentor; Gina Alajar, Dance mentor; Douglas Nierras, Singing mentor; Jai Sabas-Aracama, Grooming and Make-up mentor; Barbi Chan and Image mentor; Abbygale Arrenas de Leon. Also featured many fives: The Factor V, The V Mentors, The V Hosts together with Dingdong Dantes and Nancy Castiglione in the Final Judgment day, The Final V, and a 5 million pesos’ worth of prizes for the Ultimate Survivors. The season ended with 99 episodes on February 21, 2010, having Steven Silva and Sarah Lahbati as the Ultimate Survivors.

The series is streaming online on YouTube.

Overview

Auditions

In the last quarter of 2009, GMA Network announced that the distribution of the application form will be on August 30 and would be distributed nationwide through various malls. For this season, the age limit is set from 16 to 23 years old. There was a live coverage of the said event during SOP. Much of the auditions were held at the GMA Network's headquarters and at SM Supermalls throughout the Philippines.

The following dates and cities for the auditions were as follows:

The pilot episode was aired on November 15, 2009. The new improve edition of the popular show. The StarStruck is shown everyday having Mondays to Fridays will be tests. This season there was be a Saturday's edition is the performance night hosted by Raymond Gutierrez. The Sunday's edition is the elimination night hosted by Carla Abellana and Dennis Trillo. The show held its the Final Judgment on February 21, 2010 at the Araneta Coliseum.

Selection process
In the fifth year of the reality-talent search, Out of numerous who auditioned nationwide, only Top 100 was chosen for the first cut. From Top 100, it was trimmed down to Top 60, then from Top 60 to Top 57. These Top 57 dreamers will undergo their first acting test segment; (No Second Chances, Only Seconds To Shine) then from Top 57, it was trimmed down to Top 30, from Top 30 down to Top 20 dreamers. But to the surprise of those chosen, eight (Top 8) more were added to the fold, including aspirants from several countries where the show conducted auditions—in line with StarStruck V's intention to go international this year, from Top 28 only final fourteen finalists will be left.

The Final 14 underwent various workshops and trainings in order to develop their personalities, talents, and charisma. But, the twist is that every week, one or two from the final fourteen may have to say goodbye but this season only five remain. Those who were eliminated were dubbed as StarStruck Avengers.

This time instead of the Final 4, but this season make it the Final V will vie for the coveted the Ultimate Survivors titles, the Ultimate Male Survivor and the Ultimate Female Survivor, both of them will received P1,500,000 pesos each plus and an exclusive management contract from GMA Network with a minimum guarantee of P3,500,000 pesos, summing up to a total prize of at least P5,000,000 pesos.

This time the three Runners-up was given for this season, the first runners-up, the First Prince and First Princess titles, and for the second runner-up, the Second Prince, both of them received P200,000 pesos each plus and an exclusive management contract from the network. The StarStruck Avengers (the losing contestants) also received an exclusive contract from the network.

It also featured new runner-up title, in StarStruck History, the Second Prince in the Final Judgment Night.

Hopefuls
In this season, finally revealed of the Top 60 hopefuls where name on the show’s premier last Sunday, November 15, 2009. The half of hopefuls will be eliminated the next Sunday, November 22, 2009. The remaining Top 30 hopefuls were reduced to the Top 20 hopefuls on November 25, 2009. While the remaining twenty hopefuls, they are advanced to the next round of the competition, plus the surprise additional of the Top 8 International aspirants.

These Top 28 aspirants will be face their first artista test this week under the supervision of five mentors and the council. The Top 28 will be eliminated this Sunday, November 29, 2009. The final fourteen finalists will be revealed.

When the Final 14 was chosen, they are assigned to different challenges every week that will hone their acting, singing, and dancing abilities. Every Sunday, one is meant to leave the competition until there were just six others who are left. From survivor six, there will be last who will be eliminated and after the elimination of the one; the final five will be revealed.

The Final V will be battling with each other on the Final Judgment. People will choose who they want to win the competition by online voting and text voting. 50% of the result will come from the online and text votes and the remaining 50% is from the council.

Color key:

Profiles
 Steven Silva was born in Oceanside, California. He auditioned in Davao City and is the oldest male contestant.
 Sarah Lahbati is the youngest contestant in this year's competition, Who is 16, who hails from Switzerland, who has left everything behind to try her luck in StarStruck.
 Enzo Pineda auditioned in Makati. His father is Manny Pacquiao's agent.
 Rocco Nacino is Baguio-born as Enrico Raphael Nacino, but considers himself a Laguna-native who wants to fulfill his dreams of becoming an actor.
 Diva Montelaba was born as Hyacienth Diva Montelaba. She can sing and dance at the same time. The total performer of this season. Most notable fans of Diva call themselves Divaholics
 Nina Kodaka is dubbed as the crowd favourite. She is the contender from Japan who has always known that she wanted to be an actress.
 Ian Batherson is a German-born finalist who auditioned in the Philippines.
 Rox Montealegre is taking a break in her final year in Ateneo de Manila. She excels in acting based on the record by the mentors.
 Piero Vergara is, at 16 during the show, the youngest male contestant in the competition this year. He labels himself as a "happy-go-lucky guy".
 Princess Snell was born as Princess Tinkerbell Cristina Marjorie Pedere Snell, whose showbiz-oriented dreams are rooted in the desire to give her family a good future She recently posed for the FHM Website in 2008, as the Ran Girl of May for the Maxim Philippines' 2009 calendar and was a member of ABS-CBN's Star Magic talent management agency.
 Sef Cadayona was born as John Paul Joseph Cadayona. He considers dancing his primary talent.
 Zeryl Lim is the eldest female contestant in this year's competition. She auditioned in Bahrain as part of StarStruck V's Worldwide auditions.
 Rye Burgos is one of StarStruck V's Worldwide auditions finalist. His biggest strength, according to him, is his acting skills. “I try my best to give my natural feelings, rather than copy them from someone else.”
 Fianca Cruz says dancing is her passion, and it's where she is able to show who she really is.

Weekly Artista Tests
Color key:

Every week, the survivors undergo several artista tests, handled by the 5 mentors.

Week 1:  Featured the Top 100 up to the Top 60 hopefuls, was reduced to Top 20 hopefuls, plus the Top 8 international aspirants started on week 2.

Challenge Winner Contestant: Not Awarded
Factor I: Automatic Eliminated Contestant: None
Factor II: Saved Contestant: None
Factor IV: Bottom Group Contestant: None
Factor V: Non-Elimination Contestant: None
Top 60 Hopefuls

Top 30 Hopefuls

+Top 8 International Aspirants

Week 2:  The Top 28 hopefuls was reduced to the Final 14 hopefuls started on week 3.

Challenge Winner Contestant: Not Awarded
Factor I: Automatic Eliminated Contestant: None
Factor II: Saved Contestant: None
Factor IV: Bottom Group Contestant: None
Factor V: Non-Elimination Contestant: None

Week 3:  First acting test. The girls did a scene from Paano Ba Ang Mangarap? with its lead star and ShoutOut host Mark Herras whereas the boys did a scene from Magdusa Ka with its lead actress Katrina Halili. Later that week, they underwent a total makeover session with Barbi Chan with the help of stylists from Essensuals Toni and Guy 6750 Salon. They ended the week with their first two mall show at SM City Marikina and SM City Taytay respectively.

Challenge Winner Contestant: Not Awarded
Factor I: Automatic Eliminated Contestant: None
Factor II: Saved Contestant: None
Factor V: Non-Elimination Contestant: None

Week 4:  The lucky 13 had voice test with music mentor Jai Sabas-Aracama. It was later followed by the shoot of their first music video under music video directors Treb Monteras II (Rocco Nacino, Nina Kodaka, Piero Vergara, Sef Cadayona and Princess Snell), J. Pacena II (Steven Silva, Sarah Lahbati, Rox Montealegre and Rye Burgos) and Genghis Jimenez (Ian Batherson, Zeryl Lim, Diva Montelaba and Enzo Pineda). They had another mall show, this time in two Cavite malls, SM City Dasmariñas and SM City Rosario. Rocco Nacino and Sarah Lahbati got the best music video award for this artista test.

Factor I: Automatic Eliminated Contestant: None
Factor II: Saved Contestant: None
Factor V: Non-Elimination Contestant: None

Week 5:  The top twelve faced another mentor, this time with the dance expert Douglas Nierras. He chose 2 pairs that would have the spotlight for the Sunday Live Episode. Meanwhile, Sarah Lahbati and Zeryl Lim were not able to complete the dance workshop due to health problems thus giving them demerits. Princess Snell also received demerits for missing a dance rehearsal. Rocco Nacino and Diva Montelaba were announced as the Best Male and Female Performers of the Week and were automatically saved from elimination. Meanwhile, Nina Kodaka received a reward for winning the Facebook challenge.

Factor I: Automatic Eliminated Contestant: None
Factor II: Saved Contestant: None
Factor V: Non-Elimination Contestant: None

Week 6:  The remaining survivors, led by Nina, held a Christmas Party for some children of a chosen charity. They shopped for food, gifts and other things at SM City North EDSA. The survivors also had their first kiss flick (first introduced in The Next Level). Steven was paired with Nina Kodaka, Rocco Nacino with Princess, Sef Cadayona with Rox Montealegre, Piero Vergara with Diva Montelaba, while Sarah Lahbati, after being chosen by Gina Alajar as the best actress in their first acting test, was paired with both Ian Batherson and Enzo Pineda. Gina chose the pairs of Rocco Nacino & Princess Snell and Piero Vergara & Diva Montelaba as the best two pairs. The two boys will have a scene with Kris Bernal while the two girls with Aljur Abrenica. In the results night, the pairing of Rocco Nacino and Princess Snell won the popularity vote of the studio audience for "Best Kiss", while Rocco Nacino and Diva Montelaba, again, and won Best Male and Female Performers respectively, thus, saving them again from elimination.

Factor I: Automatic Eliminated: None
Factor II: Saved Contestant: None
Factor V: Non-Elimination Contestant: None

Week 7:  The remaining survivors had a photo shoot test under guest mentor Jun de Leon. They also had to learn the steps for the dance craze of this season, "Enjoy". The scores for this week will be carried over on Week 7 since Week 6 will use "Factor 3".

Challenge Winner Contestant: Not Awarded
Factor I: Automatic Eliminated Contestant: None
Factor II: Saved Contestant: None
Factor III: Elimination Contestant: None
Factor IV: Bottom Group Contestant: None

Week 8:  The survivor 10 had surprise artista tests this week. First was an acting test with Glaiza de Castro, directed by the 2009 Cannes Film Festival Best Director Brilliante Mendoza. For their singing test, they had a duet with Kyla. They also had a hosting test, with Lucy Torres-Gomez and Wilma  as their guests. The week ended with a live telecast of their first mall show for 2010 at SM City North EDSA.

Challenge Winner Contestant: Not Awarded
Factor I: Automatic Eliminated Contestant: None*
Factor II: Saved Contestant: None
Factor V: Non-Elimination Contestant: None

Week 9:  In preparation for a bigger acting test, the remaining survivors had an acting workshop with acting mentor Gina Alajar. For the first time, the eight remaining survivors would act altogether in one scene (entitled "Monsters") with Eula Valdez. It was directed by Maryo J. de los Reyes and the script was written by council member Floy Quintos. Also, they had another interrogation test with the Starstruck Council. They ended the week with a mall show at SM Supercenter SM City Valenzuela.

Challenge Winner Contestant: Not Awarded
Factor I: Automatic Eliminated Contestant: None
Factor III: Elimination Contestant: None

Week 10:  For the first time, the survivors did a music flick entitled "Team Song". In preparation for this, they had voice lessons with singing mentor ai Sabas-Aracama. They also recorded the songs they used for the musical; wherein they were joined by season one's first princess Yasmien Kurdi and season four avenger and Shoutout host Paulo Avelino. They ended the week with a mall show at SM City Fairview.

Challenge Winner Contestant: Not Awarded
Factor I: Automatic Eliminated Contestant: None
Factor II: Saved Contestant: None
Factor V: Non-Elimination Contestant: None

Week 11:  The remaining survivors began to live under one roof starting this week, on a place called StarStruck 1110. Each week, one Survivor would act as the "House Master", this week being Steven Silva. For their acting test, they performed their "dream roles", in a test called the Dream Flicks, directed by Soxie Topacio, the director of Philippines' Oscar Entry for 2010, Ded na si Lolo. In addition to this, the Survivors acted with TV personalities who have celebrity/famous relatives. They ended the week with a mall show at SM City Manila.

Challenge Winner Contestant: Not Awarded
Factor II: Saved Contestant: None
Factor V: Non-Elimination Contestant: None

Week 12:  The survivors did a fashion show for Guess at Trinoma. Also, the remaining survivors did cameo appearances at GMA shows including The Last Prince (Steven Silva and Rocco Nacino), Ina, Kasusuklaman Ba Kita? (Nina Kodaka and Diva Montelaba) and Gumapang Ka Sa Lusak (Sarah Lahbati and Enzo Pineda). They also did a hosting stint for Startalk, joining the segments Da Who, Chika Picka and Up Next. They also faced their mentors and ended the week with a mall show at SM City San Lazaro.

Challenge Winner Contestant: Not Awarded
Factor I: Automatic Eliminated Contestant: None
Factor II: Saved Contestant: None
Factor III: Elimination Contestant: None
Factor IV: Bottom Group Contestant: None

Week 13:  The remaining six survivors did a photoshoot for Mega Publishing Corporation's magazine, S Magazine. The pictorial appeared on the February 2010 issue of the magazine. They also faced the avenger on a special Valentine's Day date that turned out to be "Vengeance Day". Each avenger gave a black rose to a survivor they think does not deserve to earn a spot in the final five. They ended the week with a mall show at SM City Bicutan.

Week 14:  The Final V had a chance to go back to their hometown to thank their supporters. They also guested in select GMA and QTV shows to promote the upcoming Final Judgment, such as in Unang Hirit and in Tweetbiz (for their miting de avance). They also had a motorcade at the Araneta Center and had a mini mall show at the new Ali Mall wherein they handed down some tickets to their fans for the Final Judgment.

Final Judgment
The winner was announced on a two-hour TV special dubbed as StarStruck V: The Final Judgment was held live on February 21, 2010 at the Araneta Coliseum.

Hosted by Raymond Gutierrez, Carla Abellana and Dennis Trillo with guest co-hosts from the first season, Dingdong Dantes and Nancy Castiglione. The council are Lolit Solis, Floy Quintos and Iza Calzado.

The opening dance number was attended by numerous graduates, both the ultimate winners and avengers and they were joined by this season's final five. The avengers’ performance came in next, in a song and dance medley detailing the journey of the survivors from the audition process, until the introduction of the fifty-ninth graduates, the eight International contenders and the elimination of the avengers.

Joining them in their song and dance medley are their five mentors are from Gina Alajar, Douglas Nierras, Jai Sabas-Aracama, Barbi Chan and Abbygale Arrenas de Leon. And the special guest, Marian Rivera’s Sabay-Sabay Tayo dance, and then joined join the nine avengers for a dance number.

The final five then performs by own numbers. Enzo Pineda came in first with his sing and dance performance to the medley of Jay Sean's Down and Do You Remember,  Diva Montelaba performed to Lady Gaga's Bad Romance and Alexandra Burke's Bad Boys, Steven Silva came in next with another sing and dance medley to Iyaz's Replay and David Guetta's Sexy Chick, Sarah Lahbati is the only one who sang live to Jordin Sparks's This Is My Now and Miley Cyrus's The Climb, The last performer Rocco Nacino also did a sing and dance medley to Kris Allen's Live Like We're Dying and Adam Lambert's For Your Entertainment.

After the performance of the final five, they were joined onstage by graduates the ultimate winners with Mark Herras, Jennylyn Mercado, Mike Tan, Ryza Cenon, Aljur Abrenica, Jewel Mische, Mart Escudero and Kris Bernal. Only Jackie Rice was not able to attend, while Marky Cielo already passed away.

The avengers once again took the stage, performing to a medley of the previous elimination night songs. Each also received a special award: Still Standing Strong Award for Nina Kodaka, Staying Alive Award for Ian Batherson, Breakthrough Dance Award for Rox Montealegre, Future Hitmaker Award for Piero Vergara, Warrior Princess Award for Princess Snell, May Ibubuga Pa Award for Sef Cadayona, Vavavoom Award for Zeryl Lim, Fighting Spirit Award for Rye Burgos, and Reyna ng Runway Award for Fianca Cruz. The StarStruck Avengers (the losing contestants) also received an exclusive contract from the network. Right before the announcement of winners, the final five were shown with a taped message to their fans while R&B singers Kyla and Jay-R sang a duet of the song of Kelly Clarkson’s Breakaway.

Announcement come, Sarah Lahbati of Geneva, Switzerland and who represented of Dasmariñas, Cavite is the Ultimate Female Survivor with a score of 94.6%  and Steven Silva of Oceanside, California and who represented of  Davao City is the Ultimate Male Survivor with a score of 93.5%  were proclaimed as the Ultimate Survivors, each of them received P1,500,000 pesos each plus and an exclusive management contract from GMA Network with a minimum guarantee of P3, 500,000 pesos, summing up to a total prize of at least P5,000,000 pesos.

While, Diva Montelaba of Cebu City is the First Princess with a score of 91.5%, Rocco Nacino of Pasig is being declared as the first ever  the Second Prince with a score of 88.3% and Enzo Pineda of Quezon City is the First Prince with a score of 90.2%  were proclaimed as the Runners-up, each of them received P200,000 pesos each plus and an exclusive management contract from the network.

TV Assignment
For their first TV Assignment, the final five Steven Silva, Sarah Lahbati, Enzo Pineda and Diva Montelaba except Rocco Nacino headlined one of the chapters of romantic comedy, Love Bug Presents: Exchange Of Hearts.

Signature dances
There are signature dances and songs made in each batch. With this batch, their signature dances and songs are:
Enjoy
Starstruck
Sabay-Sabay Tayo

Elimination chart
Color key:

Notes

 In this season, finally revealed of the Top 60 hopefuls where name on the show’s premier last Sunday, November 15, 2009. The half of hopefuls will be eliminated the next Sunday, November 22, 2009. 
 The remaining Top 30 hopefuls were reduced to the Top 20 hopefuls on November 25, 2009. While the remaining twenty hopefuls, they are advanced to the next round of the competition, plus the surprise additional of the eight international aspirants. 
 The Top 28 hopefuls were reduced, the final fourteen was chosen on November 29, 2009.
 It was a non-elimination week on January 3, 2010 because Factor 3 was introduced. As a result, two of the survivors were eliminated from the competition on January 10, 2010. 
 No bottom group was announced. Diva Montelaba together with Princess Snell and Enzo Pineda together with Piero Vergara were called for the elimination process. The first called to eliminated is Princess Snell and the second called is Piero Vergara
 No eliminated this week because the council used their special power, Factor 2. The bottom group was Nina Kodaka, Rocco Nacino and Sarah Lahbati was safe for the elimination on January 17, 2010.
 Ian Batherson was automatic eliminated because of Factor 1. The bottom group are Rocco Nacino and Steven Silva was safe for the elimination, because only Ian Batherson got the lower scores from the council and viewers.
 This week is a pre-determined non-elimination week due to the introduction of Factor 5. Furthermore, no bottom group was announced. 
 The final five was chosen on February 14, 2010. And the last avenger is Nina Kodaka.
 In the final judgment night, Steven Silva and Sarah Lahbati were proclaimed as the Ultimate Survivors.

References

External links
 

StarStruck (Philippine TV series)
2009 Philippine television seasons
2010 Philippine television seasons